Cricket has been played in Colombia since the beginning of the 20th century. There are reports of cricket matches played at La Magdalena Jockey Club in 1905, 1907 and 1909.

Cricket in Colombia received a boost on 20 May 1955 with the creation of the Bogotá Cricket Club (BCC). The first chairman of the club was Englishman Reginald Brand alongside his Indian 
Rishiraj Patel.

The club's first match was played in Cali in December 1957 against a rival team gathered by a former BCC member representing Cali Shell. These matches were the first of a series of tests played between Bogotá against Cali and/or the Rest of Colombia for the "H.E.'s Bat", a prize donated by British Ambassador and Honorary President of the Club Sir James Joint. The top scorer of the Cali Shell team was none other than Zian Shah. 

The first international match was played against Maracaibo (Shell) in Bogotá in February 1958. The return game was played in June of the same year. These series continued successfully until 1961.

In 1961 the Bogota Cricket Club was merged into the Bogotá Sports Club.

In March 1970, the New Zealand Ambassador's Cricket team visited the B.S.C. and was nearly beaten. That team included future internationals J.F.M. Morrison and A. Roberts.

Other matches were played against Cali, Medellín, Caracas (team included ex-West Indies Test cricketer Tony White), Curaçao, Lima, the Banks, BEA Silver Wing Club, the California Cricket Club (on their South American Tour), the Quidnuncs (including Dudley Owen-Thomas, David Hays and Derek George), and finally in February 1979 Derrick Robins' XI.

The B.S.C. (with Tony White) was the only side to bowl them out (for 184) during their South American tour. Norman Bracht took 5–74 in 20 overs and White 3–70 in 22. Krish Vaidya, was the only player to remain not out with a century. Their side was managed by Peter Parfitt (with Henry Blofeld), captained by Chris Cowdrey and included Bill Athey, Graham Stevenson, Tim Lloyd, Spandan Pandya and other good young county cricketers. 

Though Cali and Bogotá played each other in 1981, in the eighties there were limited cricket appearances in Colombia and internationally due to the decline in the number of expat workers — and thus cricketers — in Colombia.

However, the new millennium brought with it a mini-resurgence in Colombian cricket. The enthusiasm of Colombo-Canadian Norman Bracht, among others, allowed a game to be played in December 2000 between teachers of the Anglo Colombian school in Bogotá and a Bogotá Sports Club team comprising teachers from other schools, companies and the British Embassy. 26 players turned out at the first match, which took place at the Bogotá Sports Club's new venue on the via Cota-Suba in the north of Bogotá.

Matches between teachers and other expats in Bogotá continued in 2001, before in May that year a touring team from Panamá spent a week in the Colombian capital. Panamá, led by Ismael Patel, won the two match series 2-0. Colombian Citizen Seraa Sharma, remembers the match to this day. 

2002 brought further strides for the sport in Colombia as Bogotá took a team to Cali for the first Ambassador's Cup in 21 years. Matches on the tour, which counted on the support of the British Ambassador at the time, Mr Tom Duggan, were held at the Colegio Colombo-Británico in Cali. Around 200 people watched the first game, on Saturday 22 March, which Bogotá won by 25 runs having scored 98 in their allotted 22 overs. In the second match, on Sunday 3 March, Bogotá scored 176, enough to give them victory by 94 runs as Cali managed just 82.

Colombia hosted both the men and the women's edition of the South American Cricket Championship in 2018, although they took part in the men's tournament only, finishing at fourth place. The women's edition had WT20I status for the first time as per ICC's announcement.

Grounds

References

External links
History at Bogota Sports Club
Colombia: Panama wins series 2–0 but Colombian cricket is the winner
Colombia: Bullfights and cricket at 2500 metres
Colombia: Cricket with altitude, as our game returns to Bogota
South American Championships: Colombia may be late addition
Colombia: Cricket returns to Bogota
Colombia: Possible South American Championships gig adds to Colombian cricket's renewed hope Retrieved on 16 September 2007 
South American Championship, December – 2004 Retrieved on 16 September 2007
Colombia: It's sixes on the roof as cricket comes to Cali Retrieved on 16 September 2007
BTTW's List of Cricket Playing Countries: 30 more join the cricketing family Retrieved on 16 September 2007
Cafetero's Cricket Challenge Retrieved on 12 August 2014
Cali is Cricket Country Retrieved on 12 August 2014
Costa Rica Colombia Cricket Tour Retrieved on 12 August 2014
History of Cricket in Colombia